Acacia adunca, commonly known as the Wallangarra wattle and the Cascade wattle, is a species of Acacia native to eastern Australia.

The phyllodes are dark green and lustrous and feel oily to touch. It produces masses of golden ball flowers from late winter to early spring.

A. adunca has a range that extends from the tablelands of southern Queensland to northern New South Wales.

See also
List of Acacia species

References

adunca
Fabales of Australia
Flora of New South Wales
Flora of Queensland
Taxa named by Allan Cunningham (botanist)